Drag Me to Hell is a 2009 American supernatural horror film directed and co-written by Sam Raimi. It stars Alison Lohman, Justin Long, Lorna Raver, Dileep Rao, David Paymer, and Adriana Barraza. The plot, written with his older brother Ivan, focuses on a loan officer, who, because she has to prove to her boss that she can make the "hard decisions", chooses not to extend an elderly woman's mortgage. In retaliation, the woman places a curse on the loan officer that, after three days of escalating torment, will plunge her into the depths of Hell to burn for eternity.

Raimi wrote Drag Me to Hell with his brother before working on the Spider-Man trilogy. The film premiered at the Cannes Film Festival and was a box office success, grossing over $90 million worldwide. Drag Me to Hell won the award for Best Horror Film at the 2009 Scream Awards and the 2010 Saturn Awards. A sequel is in development.

Plot
In 1969 Pasadena, a Hispanic couple seek help from young medium Shaun San Dena, saying their son is ill and hears evil voices after stealing a silver necklace from a Gypsy wagon, despite trying to return it. San Dena prepares a séance, but an unseen force attacks them and drags the boy to Hell. San Dena vows to fight the demon again one day.

In present-day Los Angeles, bank loan officer Christine Brown vies for a promotion to assistant branch manager with her co-worker Stu Rubin. Her boss, Jim Jacks, advises her to demonstrate tough decision-making. Sylvia Ganush, an elderly and disheveled European Roma woman, asks for a third extension on her mortgage. After Christine denies her request, Ganush cries and begs not to have her house repossessed. Security guards arrive and she leaves, angrily accusing Christine of shaming her. In the parking lot, Ganush ambushes and violently attacks Christine. After a long struggle, Ganush rips a button from Christine's coat and curses it. Later, Christine and her boyfriend Clay Dalton visit fortune teller Rham Jas, who tells Christine a dark spirit is haunting her. At home, the entity begins to violently attack Christine. At work, she hallucinates about Ganush and bleeds profusely from her nose while spewing blood on Jacks. As Christine leaves, Stu steals a file from her desk.

Christine goes to beg Ganush for forgiveness but discovers she has recently died. After causing a scene at the funeral, a family member of Ganush warns her that she deserves everything she is about to get. Christine returns to Jas, who explains that as long as she owns the cursed button, a powerful demon known as the Lamia will torment her for three days before dragging her to Hell. He suggests a sacrifice may appease it. Christine reluctantly sacrifices her pet kitten before meeting Clay's parents at their house for dinner, during which grotesque hallucinations torment her again.

Christine returns to Jas, who requests a fee of $10,000. He introduces her to San Dena, who prepares a séance to trap Lamia in a goat and kill it. However, the Lamia possesses her and then her assistant, who vomits up the corpse of Christine's cat, saying it wants her soul. San Dena manages to successfully banish the Lamia from the séance, but dies afterwards. Jas seals the button in an envelope and tells Christine that she can only remove the curse by giving the button to someone else. She attempts to give the envelope at a diner: to a tearful Stu (whom she tries to blackmail into accepting it) and to an ailing, married elderly woman; bothered by her conscience, she does neither. Rather, she digs up Ganush's grave and shoves the envelope into her mouth at dawn. Christine returns home and prepares to meet Clay at Los Angeles Union Station for a weekend trip. Jacks notifies her of the promotion after Stu confessed to stealing her file and was fired.

At the station, Clay, hoping to propose to Christine, hands her the envelope with her missing button he found in his car, unaware of its significance. She realizes that she accidentally gave the wrong envelope to Ganush, which means the curse was never lifted. Horrified, Christine backs away and falls onto the tracks, just as fiery, demonic hands emerge. Clay tries to rescue Christine, but a train speeds through and he can only watch as the hands drag her to Hell.

Cast

The film includes cameo appearances by Raimi himself as an uncredited ghost at the séance, his younger brother Ted as a doctor, and his eldest children Emma, Henry, and Lorne in minor roles. Frequent Raimi collaborator Scott Spiegel appears as a mourner at the death feast, while fellow frequent Raimi collaborator John Paxton and Irene Roseen appear as the old couple at the diner.

Production

Background
The original story for Drag Me to Hell was written ten years before the film went into production and was written by Sam Raimi and his brother Ivan Raimi. The film went into production under the name The Curse. The Raimis wrote the script as a morality tale, desiring to write a story about a character who wants to be a good person, but makes a sinful choice out of greed for her own betterment and pays the price for it. The Raimis tried to make the character of Christine the main focal point in the film, and tried to have Christine in almost all the scenes in the film. Elements of the film's story are drawn from the British horror film Night of the Demon (itself an adaptation of M.R. James' short story "Casting the Runes") such as the similar-shaped demons and the three-day curse theme in the film. The most significant parallel is that both stories involve the passing of a cursed object, which has to be passed to someone else, or its possessor will be devoured by one or more demons. Unlike his past horror films, Raimi wanted the film to be rated PG-13 and not strictly driven by gore, stating, "I didn't want to do exactly the same thing I had done before."

After finishing the script, Raimi desired to make the picture after the first draft of the script was completed, but other projects such as the Spider-Man film series became a nearly decade-long endeavor, pushing opportunities to continue work on Drag Me to Hell to late 2007. Raimi offered director Edgar Wright to direct Drag Me to Hell which Wright turned down as he was filming Hot Fuzz and felt that "If I did it, it would just feel like karaoke." After the previous three Spider-Man films, Raimi came back to the script of Drag Me to Hell, wanting to make a simpler and lower-budget film. In 2007, Sam Raimi's friend and producer Robert Tapert of Ghost House Pictures had the company sign on to finance the film. Universal Studios agreed to distribute domestically.

Casting
After completing the script and having the project greenlit, Raimi started casting the film. Elliot Page was originally cast for the main role of Christine, but dropped out of the project due to SAG strike-related scheduling issues. The main role eventually went to Lohman, who did not enjoy horror films, but enjoyed doing the stunts during filming. Stage actress Lorna Raver auditioned for the role of Mrs. Ganush. Raver was not aware of the specific nature of her character until being cast, stating that all she had read was "about a little old lady coming into the bank because they're closing down her house. It was only later that I saw the whole script and said, 'Oh my!'". To prepare for this role, Raver met with a Hungarian dialect coach and asked to have portions of the script translated into Hungarian. Raimi would later ask Raver to use some of the Hungarian words in the scenes of Ganush's attacking Christine. Dileep Rao, who plays Rham Jas, made producer Grant Curtis mildly hesitant in casting him, stating that during his audition "he was a little bit younger than he read in the script. But as we were looking at his reading, Sam said, 'There's no minimum age requirement on wisdom.' Dileep has that wisdom and presence on screen, and that's what made him right. Once he got on camera, he brought that shoulder for Alison to lean on." Many of the actors playing secondary characters in Drag Me to Hell have appeared previously in Raimi's films, including Joanne Baron, Tom Carey, Molly Cheek, Aimee Miles, John Paxton, Ted Raimi, Bill E. Rogers, Chelcie Ross, and Octavia Spencer.

Filming
Raimi said he set out to create "a horror film with lots of wild moments and lots of suspense and big shocks that'll hopefully make audiences jump. But I also wanted to have a lot of dark humor sprinkled throughout. I spent the last decade doing Spider-Man and you come to rely on a lot of people doing things for you and a lot of help, but it's refreshing and wonderful to be reminded that, as with most filmmakers, the best way to do it is yourself, with a tight team doing the main jobs."

Production for Drag Me to Hell began on location in Tarzana, California. The production team included director of photography Peter Deming, production designer Steve Saklad and visual effects supervisor Bruce Jones. The film was produced by Grant Curtis and Rob Tapert. Tapert and Raimi are longtime collaborators, having attended college together in Michigan.

Editing
Drag Me to Hell was edited by Bob Murawski, who has collaborated with Raimi on several films including the Spider-Man series, The Gift, and Army of Darkness. Raimi has said of working with Murawski on Drag Me to Hell, "He'd come (down to the set) to see how things were going and to let me know if he'd just cut something that wasn't working the way he'd wanted it to, or to suggest a pick-up shot I should get for a piece he felt we needed in a sequence I hadn't realized I needed. He's very detail-oriented... So we're very close collaborators." Raimi finds editing with Murawski to be "relaxing", adding, "I love it. For me, it's so relaxing, unlike pre-production, which is fraught with anxiety and fear about how we're going to do things, and production, which is so rushed and a sleepless time and you're just racing to finish every shot and worrying about focus and so on. So post is soothing and I can watch the film come together, so it's a time of discovery for me as Bob and I fit all the pieces together. I see new possibilities in post, as Bob puts the film together, sometimes in a way I never imagined..." The film was edited by Murawski on an Avid computer system in a West Los Angeles facility. The color grading was completed at Company 3 with colorist Stephen Nakamura. Nakamura used DaVinci Resolve. It was CO3's first start-to-finish feature in 4K resolution. "For us, post is a very creative time where it's not just about this factory producing the blueprinted product. It's really a very creative, experimental time where we try and take everything that's been written and then shot to the next level," said Raimi. The final sound mix was completed at the Dub Stage in Burbank with mixers Marti Humphrey and Chris Jacobson.

Effects
The effects in Drag Me to Hell were created in many different ways, including green screen, puppets, prosthetics and computer-generated imagery. Bruce Jones was the visual effects supervisor on the film. Of Jones, Raimi commented, "He brought a great can-do approach to the film... He's got a great team of artists and technicians with him, and he's got great instincts."

There were hundreds of visual effects in the film, and different effects houses were utilized. According to Raimi, the Bay Area's Tippett Studio was a big player. "We also had work done by Amalgamated Pixels, Ghost VFX, KNB Effects, Home Digital, Cinesoup and IE Effects," said Raimi. According to Raimi, "Bob (Murawski) and I kept adding visual effects as post proceeded. In this film, the supernatural, the unseen, is almost another character, so sequences were developed — even in post — that would suggest the presence of the supernatural, and we kept on adding. The same with the sound effects, so it was a very ongoing, very live process in post."

Director of photography Peter Deming tried to use realistic lighting in the film. Said Deming, "Normally, you'd put all corrected bulbs in, but we went with what was there, including the shots in the street. We used the streetlight look and mixed that with interior lighting. There were a lot of odd color sources that we chose to leave the way they would be naturally. It's a heightened sense of realism." One of the earliest projects the special effects teams did was the scene in which Mrs. Ganush attacks Christine in her car. To film the action, which included close-ups of Christine jamming her foot on the pedal, hitting the brake, and shifting gears, the team created a puzzle car which allowed the front engine compartment and back trunk — as well as all four sides and doors — to come away from the car. The roof came off in two directions.

Soundtrack

The film score was composed by Christopher Young. Young has worked with director Raimi previously on his films The Gift and Spider-Man 3. The soundtrack was released on August 18, 2009. Sam Raimi stated that emphasis was on using the soundtrack to create a world that didn't exist, a world of the "supernatural". The score contains elements of Young's previous work on Flowers in the Attic. This is particularly apparent in the utilization of the ethereal childlike soprano vocals that feature prominently throughout the soundtrack.

All tracks composed by Christopher Young.

The soundtrack was released by Waxwork Records in 2018 on vinyl record.

Release
Drag Me to Hell was first shown to the public as a "Work in Progress" print at the South by Southwest festival on March 15, 2009. The film debuted in its full form at the 2009 Cannes Film Festival, where it was shown out of competition on May 20, 2009, as a midnight screening.

Reception

Box office
The film was released in the United States on May 29, 2009. The film opened at #4 with $15.8 million from 2,900 screens at 2,508 theaters, an average of $6,310 per theater ($5,457 average per screen). In its second weekend, it dropped 56%, falling to #7, with $7 million, for an average of $2,805 per theater ($2,514 average per screen), and bringing the 10-day gross to $28,233,230. Drag Me to Hell closed on August 6, 2009, with a final gross in the United States and Canada of $42.1 million, and an additional $48.7 million internationally for a total of $90.8 million worldwide.

Critical response 
On Rotten Tomatoes the film has an approval rating of 92% based on 270 reviews, and an average rating of 7.6/10. The site's critical consensus states, "Sam Raimi returns to top form with Drag Me to Hell, a frightening, hilarious, delightfully campy thrill ride." On Metacritic the film has a weighted average score of 83 out of 100, based on 32 critics, indicating "universal acclaim". Audiences polled by CinemaScore gave the film an average grade of "B−" on an A+ to F scale.

Positive critical reception of the film generally praised the film's scary but humorous and campy tone. Owen Gleiberman of Entertainment Weekly gave the film an A rating, stating that "Raimi has made the most crazy, fun, and terrifying horror movie in years." Betsy Sharkey of the Los Angeles Times praised the film, stating that it "should not be dismissed as yet another horror flick just for teens. The filmmakers have given us a 10-story winding staircase of psychological tension that is making very small circles near the end." Michael Phillips of the Chicago Tribune described the film as a "hellaciously effective B-movie [that] comes with a handy moral tucked inside its scares, laughs and Raimi's specialty, the scare/laugh hybrid." Roger Ebert of the Chicago Sun Times gave the film 3 out of 4 stars, and stated that the film "is a sometimes funny and often startling horror movie. That is what it wants to be, and that is what it is." In a positive review, Variety said of the film: "Scant and barren of subtext, the pic is single-mindedly devoted to pushing the audience's buttons... Still, there's no denying it delivers far more than competing PG-13 thrillers."

Bloody Disgusting gave the film four and a half stars out of five, with the review calling it "quite simply the most perfect horror film I've seen in a long, long while... [It's] a blast and moved quickly from start to finish [and] is well on its way to becoming an immediate classic." The film was then ranked thirteenth in Bloody Disgusting's list of the 'Top 20 Horror Films of the Decade'.

Kyle Smith of the New York Post thought it was cheesy, with too many "gross-outs", Rex Reed of The New York Observer thought that the plot wasn't believable enough, and Peter Howell of The Toronto Star disliked Lohman's performance and thought it was "just not very funny".

Reviews have also received the film as a comedy horror in a more classic Raimi vein. Vic Holtreman of Screenrant claims the film is a long-awaited movie that combines both genres as Army of Darkness had done. A reviewer at UGO Networks says that the film is very much more a comedy than horror and that this is in keeping with Raimi not having produced a "true horror" film since he began directing.

Accolades
The film was nominated for "Choice Movie: Horror/Thriller" at the 2009 Teen Choice Awards, which the film lost to Friday the 13th (2009). At the 2009 Scream Awards show, Drag Me to Hell won the awards for Best Horror Movie and Best Scream-play.

Home media
Drag Me to Hell was released on DVD and Blu-ray Disc in the US on October 13, 2009. Both media include an Unrated Director's Cut as well as the Theatrical Version. In its first two weeks the DVD sold 459,217 copies generating $7.98 million in sales. It since accumulated $13.9 million in DVD sales in the United States.

On February 13, 2018, Scream Factory released a two-disc Collector's Edition of Drag Me to Hell, which included both edits of the film remastered from the 2K digital intermediate, archival interviews and featurettes and all-new interviews with Alison Lohman, Lorna Raver and Christopher Young.

Sequel 
In March 2023, director Sam Raimi confirmed that a sequel is in early stages of development.

See also
 Evil Dead
 Hellbound, a 2021 South Korean TV series with a similar plot
 Inferno, a 2016 film with a similar theme
 List of ghost films

References

External links
 
 
 
 
 
 Drag Me to Hell Full Production Notes

2009 films
2009 horror films
2000s supernatural films
American ghost films
American supernatural horror films
Demons in film
Fictional representations of Romani people
Films about curses
American films about revenge
Films directed by Sam Raimi
Films scored by Christopher Young
Films set in 1969
Films set in 2009
Films set in Los Angeles
Films set in Pasadena, California
Hell in popular culture
Films about Romani people
Films with screenplays by Sam Raimi
2000s Spanish-language films
Films about spirit possession
Universal Pictures films
Films about witchcraft
Films shot in Los Angeles
2000s English-language films
2000s American films